"Hungry, Hungry Homer" is the fifteenth episode of the twelfth season of the American television series The Simpsons. It first aired on the Fox network in the United States on March 4, 2001. In the episode, Homer becomes a Good Samaritan after discovering the simple joys of helping people in need – which is put to the test when he goes on a hunger strike after the owner of the Springfield Isotopes baseball team attempts to discredit him when Homer stumbles on his plot to discreetly move the team to Albuquerque, New Mexico.

The episode was written by John Swartzwelder and directed by Nancy Kruse, and guest starred Stacy Keach as Howard K. Duff VIII.

Since airing, it has received generally mixed reviews from television critics. The episode inspired the naming of the Albuquerque Isotopes minor-league baseball team, which began play in 2003.

Plot
The Simpson family visits Blockoland, a theme park similar to Legoland which is completely made of blocks. When Lisa finds a piece missing from an Eiffel Tower kit she has bought, Homer persuades the gift shop clerk to give it to her. Energized by the idea of "standing up for the little guy", Homer talks a girl Bart likes into going to a school dance with him, gets a beauty salon owner to put free highlights in Marge's hair, and finds a way for the salon to cut its expenses. He next tries to get Lenny a refund on his season tickets for the Springfield Isotopes baseball team (previously introduced in the season 2 episode "Dancin' Homer"), after they continue to lose games repeatedly since being taken over by Duff Beer. At the Isotopes' ballpark, Homer encounters team owner Howard K. Duff VIII, who refuses to grant a refund. As he leaves, Homer goes through the wrong door and discovers a room filled with merchandise for the "Albuquerque Isotopes" and realizes that Howard is planning to move the team. Howard denies the idea, then has Duffman drug Homer and dump him at the Simpsons' house to cover up the truth.

Homer attempts to warn the media of Howard's plan, but by the time he can lead reporters to the ballpark, Howard has removed all evidence of it. Homer is denounced a liar by the media and Howard embarrasses him further by showing footage of him with his pants on fire on television. In retaliation, Homer stages a hunger strike, chaining himself to a pole in the parking lot and refusing to leave or eat until Howard admits the truth. After Homer begins to attract public attention, the team secretly moves him into the ballpark one night and dubs him "Hungry, Hungry Homer" as a publicity stunt. They claim publicly that Homer will not eat until the Isotopes win the pennant, covering up his real message. As his health declines and he begins rapidly losing weight, he nearly gives in while seeing fans eat at the ballpark. However, a visit by the ghost of Cesar Chavez (who assumes the appearance of Cesar Romero, since Homer does not know what Chavez looks like) inspires him to stand his ground.

Thinking that Homer has gone insane and that his popularity is waning, Howard unchains him and offers him a hot dog in a public ceremony during an Isotopes game. As Homer is about to eat it, he realizes that it is loaded with Southwestern-style toppings and angrily denounces Howard. Inspecting their own hot dogs, the fans discover their wrappers marked with the "Albuquerque Isotopes" team name and realize that Homer was right from the start. The crowd boos Howard, and Duffman turns against him and throws him bodily off the field. Homer earns a round of cheers from the crowd and ends his hunger strike, eagerly devouring the food they throw to him. Watching the scenes on television, the mayor of Albuquerque abandons his plan to steal the Isotopes from Springfield and decides to turn his attention to purchasing the Dallas Cowboys, with the intent of forcing them to play baseball instead of football, declaring, "They'll play what I tell 'em to play, for I am the Mayor of Albuquerque!"

Production
The episode was written by John Swartzwelder and directed by Nancy Kruse. The episode was originally pitched by Al Jean from his daughter, although it is not certain. The origin of the episode is that Mike Scully in season 8 pitched an episode where Homer gets a motorcycle, however the town passes a helmet law that requires riders to wear a helmet, leading Homer to go on a hunger strike in protest. The writers shelved the idea of Homer having a motorcycle (though it would be used for the season 11 episode "Take My Wife, Sleaze"), but held on to Homer having a hunger strike until Al Jean pitched this episode. Another inspiration was that a team was moving to another city. Dan Castellaneta adlibbed the lyrics to Homer's "Dancing Away My Hunger Pains" song. The ending scene with the mayor announcing his plans to take over the Dallas Cowboys has been edited from all U.S. syndicated reruns, but has been seen on overseas syndicated reruns and on the season 12 DVD set.

Cultural references
The title of the episode is a reference to the Hasbro tabletop game Hungry Hungry Hippos.

Duffman turning against Howard K. Duff and throwing him over a fence is a reference to Darth Vader turning on Emperor Palpatine in the film Return of the Jedi (1983).

After being drugged, Homer wakes up lying on top of a dog house, similar to the way Snoopy lies on his dog house in the Peanuts comic strip. (Bart even says "Good Grief!" in another reference to the strip.) Later, when Homer returns to the Duff Stadium and finds the private room empty, a man plays "wah-wah" on a muted trumpet, again a reference to Peanuts.

When tied to the flagpole, Lisa gives Homer a book to read called My Core Beliefs by Mike Farrell. Homer flips through it and says "Man, he really hates Wayne Rogers." This is in reference to the named actors' characters on the TV show M*A*S*H, in which Farrell's character BJ Hunnicutt replaced Rogers' character Trapper John McIntyre.

Reception
In its original American broadcast, "Hungry, Hungry Homer" was viewed by an estimated 10.0156 million households and received a 9.8 rating/15 share Nielsen Rating making it into the top twenty.

Colin Jacobson of DVD Movie Guide gave the episode a mixed review writing "Though it has something of a rehashed feel – an impression that we’ve seen this episode before – ‘Hungry’ still manages to be fairly effective. Chock full of laughs? No, but the show has its moments. Or maybe I just like it because it's the origin of the word ‘hungy’, which I used for many years. I forgot I stole it from this episode!"

Judge Mac McEntire of DVD Verdict said of the episode that the best moment was pretty much any scene with Duffman.

Legacy
This episode inspired the name of the real-life Albuquerque Isotopes minor-league baseball team, which came to Albuquerque in 2003 after being known as the Calgary Cannons. A few days after the episode aired, Albuquerque Journal journalist Leanne Potts acknowledged how then Mayor Jim Baca was making similar efforts to move the Canadian baseball team to Albuquerque with a $28 million stadium offer, even stating "it seemed the "Simpsons" writers were commenting on politics in Albuquerque" and that the episode "wasn't a case of cartoons imitating life, but of life imitating cartoons." In tribute to the episode, statues of Homer, Marge, Bart and Lisa were placed in the Albuquerque Isotopes stadium.

This episode has also been credited for popularizing the word "meh", which later entered the Collins English Dictionary. The word is an interjection expressing boredom or indifference, and an adjective describing something boring or mediocre. The word, which has its root in Yiddish, is expressly spelled out in the episode:

Homer: Kids, how would you like to go to ... Blockoland!
Bart and Lisa: Meh.
Homer:	But the TV gave me the impression that --
Bart:	We said, "Meh!"
Lisa:	M-e-h, meh.

The word had been used on several previous occasions on the show, the first such usage being in the season six episode "Sideshow Bob Roberts" in 1994. In that episode, Lisa is given the town's voting record for the mayoral election; in response to her question that she "thought this was a secret ballot," the official responds "meh". John Swartzwelder, the writer of "Hungry, Hungry Homer" has stated that he "originally heard the word from an advertising writer named Howie Krakow back in 1970 or 1971 who insisted it was the funniest word in the world."

Homer's line "...I gave the guy directions, even though I didn't know the way. Because that's the kind of guy I am this week." is paraphrased by Patrick Stump in his band Fall Out Boy's 2005 single "Sugar, We're Goin' Down".

References

External links

'Meh': new word for indifference enters English dictionary

The Simpsons (season 12) episodes
2001 American television episodes
Television shows written by John Swartzwelder
Baseball animation